The union-closed sets conjecture is an open problem in combinatorics posed by Péter Frankl in 1979. A family of sets is said to be union-closed if the union of any two sets from the family belongs to the family. The conjecture states:  For every finite union-closed family of sets, other than the family containing only the empty set, there exists an element that belongs to at least half of the sets in the family.

Professor Timothy Gowers has called this "one of the best known open problems in combinatorics" and has said that the conjecture "feels as though it ought to be easy (and as a result has attracted a lot of false proofs over the years). A good way to understand why it isn't easy is to spend an afternoon trying to prove it. That clever averaging argument you had in mind doesn't work ..."

Example 
The family of setsconsists of five different sets and is union-closed. The element  is contained in three of the five sets (and so is the element ), thus the conjecture holds in this case.

Basic results 
It is easy to show that if a union-closed family contains a singleton  (as in the example above), then the element  must occur in at least half of the sets of the family.

If there is a counterexample to the conjecture, then there is also a counterexample consisting only of finite sets. Therefore, without loss of generality, we will assume that all sets in the given union-closed family are finite.

Therefore, in general we cannot ask for an element contained in more than half of the sets of the family: the bound of the conjecture is sharp.

Equivalent forms

Intersection formulation 

 
The following facts show the equivalence.
 
Firstly, we show that a set system is union-closed if and only if its complement is intersection-closed.
 
Lemma 1.
 
Proof.
 
 
 
Secondly, we show that if a set system contains an element in at least half the sets, then its complement has an element in at most half.
 
Lemma 2. A set system  contains an element in half of its sets if and only if the complement set system ,  contains an element in at most half of its sets.
Proof. Trivial.

Therefore, if  is a union-closed family of sets, the family of complement sets to sets in  relative to the universe , is closed under intersection, and an element that belongs to at least half of the sets of  belongs to at most half of the complement sets. Thus, an equivalent form of the conjecture (the form in which it was originally stated) is that, for any intersection-closed family of sets that contains more than one set, there exists an element that belongs to at most half of the sets in the family.

Lattice formulation 
Although stated above in terms of families of sets, Frankl's conjecture has also been formulated and studied as a question in lattice theory. A lattice is a partially ordered set in which for two elements x and y there is a unique greatest element less than or equal to both of them (the meet of x and y) and a unique least element greater than or equal to both of them (the join of x and y). The family of all subsets of a set S, ordered by set inclusion, forms a lattice in which the meet is represented by the set-theoretic intersection and the join is represented by the set-theoretic union; a lattice formed in this way is called a Boolean lattice.
The lattice-theoretic version of Frankl's conjecture is that in any finite lattice there exists an element x that is not the join of any two smaller elements, and such that the number of elements greater than or equal to x totals at most half the lattice, with equality only if the lattice is a Boolean lattice. As  shows, this statement about lattices is equivalent to the Frankl conjecture for union-closed sets: each lattice can be translated into a union-closed set family, and each union-closed set family can be translated into a lattice, such that the truth of the Frankl conjecture for the translated object implies the truth of the conjecture for the original object. This lattice-theoretic version of the conjecture is known to be true for several natural subclasses of lattices but remains open in the general case.

Graph-theoretic formulation 
Another equivalent formulation of the union-closed sets conjecture uses graph theory. In an undirected graph, an independent set is a set of vertices no two of which are adjacent to each other; an independent set is maximal if it is not a subset of a larger independent set. In any graph, the "heavy" vertices that appear in more than half of the maximal independent sets must themselves form an independent set. So, if the graph is non-empty, there always exists at least one non-heavy vertex, a vertex that appears in at most half of the maximal independent sets. The graph formulation of the union-closed sets conjecture states that every finite non-empty graph contains two adjacent non-heavy vertices. It is automatically true when the graph contains an odd cycle, because the independent set of all heavy vertices cannot cover all the edges of the cycle. Therefore, the more interesting case of the conjecture is for bipartite graphs, which have no odd cycles. Another equivalent formulation of the conjecture is that, in every bipartite graph, there exist two vertices, one on each side of the bipartition, such that each of these two vertices belongs to at most half of the graph's maximal independent sets. This conjecture is known to hold for chordal bipartite graphs, bipartite series–parallel graphs, and bipartite graphs of maximum degree three.

Partial results 
The conjecture has been proven for many special cases of union-closed set families. In particular, it is known to be true for
 families of at most 46 sets.
 families of sets whose union has at most 11 elements.
 families of sets in which the smallest set has one or two elements.
 families of at least  subsets of an -element set, for some constant , according to an unpublished preprint.
In November 2022, a preprint was posted claiming a proof of the following statement:

For every union-closed family, other than the family containing only the empty set, there exists an element that belongs to at least a fraction of 0.01 of the sets in the family.

The proof used probabilistic and entropy methods to obtain such a bound. The union-closed sets conjecture itself corresponds to the fraction . 

History 
Péter Frankl stated the conjecture in terms of intersection-closed set families in 1979, and so the conjecture is usually credited to him and is sometimes referred to as the Frankl conjecture.

Notes

References

External links
Frankl's union-closed sets conjecture, the Open Problem Garden.
Union-Closed Sets Conjecture (1979). In ''Open Problems – Graph Theory and Combinatorics, collected by D. B. West.

Families of sets
Conjectures
Unsolved problems in mathematics
Lattice theory